Thionck Essyl (also called Tionk Essil) is a town in Ziguinchor, Senegal, located 65 km north-west of the region capital.

Etymology
The name of the town means "cook remaining crouched."

History
The origins of the town are connected to the kingdom of Mof-Ewi, when it was populated by defectors from Guinea-Bissau. Long considered the largest village in Senegal, the village was urbanized in 1990.

Administration
Thionck Essyl is part of the arrondissement of Tendouck in Bignona, Ziguinchor.

Geography
The nearest towns are Hilol, Mantat, Etouta, Mlomp, Tendouck, and Djimande.

Population
The population is primarily Jola. Some sources suggest that more than 10000 people live in Thionck Essyl, however the census of 2002 stated that the town's population was only 8006 living in 1021 households. According to official estimates, the population was supposed to reach 8507 by the end of 2007. According to PEPAM (Water and Sanitation Program for the Millennium), however, there are currently 6954 people and 968 households in Thionck Essyl.

Economy
The borders of the town do not lend themselves to easy growth. The town hospital is not very functional because of the law budget, there remains 2 doctors, of the more than 10 there were. There is a high school in the town.

See also

Bibliography

References

External links
 Thionck Essyl on the PEPAM website
 Les Amis de Thionck Essyl

Populated places in the Bignona Department
Communes of Senegal

Cooperation has been  established with medical doctors from Barcelona.